Ondrej Rusnák (born 25 February 1989, in Bratislava) is a Slovak retired professional ice hockey player. He is currently working as an assistant coach for ASC Corona Brașov of the Erste Liga.

Rusnák played in the Tipsport Liga for HC Slovan Bratislava, HC Dukla Trenčín, MsHK Žilina and HK Poprad.

He is a son of former Czechoslovak international Dárius Rusnák.

References

External links

1989 births
Living people
Brest Albatros Hockey players
MKS Cracovia (ice hockey) players
HSC Csíkszereda players
HK Dukla Trenčín players
HK Poprad players
Slovak ice hockey centres
HC Slovan Bratislava players
Ice hockey people from Bratislava
MsHK Žilina players
Slovak expatriate ice hockey people
Slovak expatriate sportspeople in Romania
Expatriate ice hockey players in Romania
Slovak expatriate sportspeople in Poland
Expatriate ice hockey players in Poland